Olga Hudenko (born 19 August 1991) is a track cyclist from  Russia. She represented her nation at the 2015 UCI Track Cycling World Championships.

Major results
2014
Grand Prix Minsk
1st Keirin
1st Sprint
Grand Prix of Russian Helicopters
1st Sprint
2nd Keirin
2015
Grand Prix of Tula
2nd Keirin
3rd Sprint
Memorial of Alexander Lesnikov
2nd Keirin
2nd Sprint

References

External links
 profile at Cyclingarchives.com

1991 births
Russian female cyclists
Living people
Place of birth missing (living people)
21st-century Russian women